Sir Herbert Alker Tripp CBE (23 August 1883 – 12 December 1954), usually known as Alker Tripp or H. Alker Tripp, was a senior English police official who served as an Assistant Commissioner of the London Metropolitan Police from 1932 to 1947.

Early life and career
Tripp was born in London, the son of George Henry Tripp, a civil servant who later became Receiver for the Metropolitan Police District. Tripp's ambition was to become an artist, but family disapproval led to him joining the civil staff at Scotland Yard as a clerk in the Commissioner's Office on 22 December 1902. He held a number of posts before being appointed chairman of the Police Recruiting Board in 1920. In this post he conceived of the idea of a police college, which was later established by Lord Trenchard. By 1928, Tripp was assistant secretary in the Metropolitan Police Office.

Assistant Commissioner
On 15 January 1932, Tripp was appointed Assistant Commissioner "B", in charge of traffic. He was the first member of Scotland Yard's civilian staff to be appointed to this rank (at this time the Assistant Commissioners were not police officers, although they wore police uniform on formal occasions). He devoted the next fifteen years to the study of London's traffic problems, and also traffic problems of other cities throughout Europe and North America, becoming a recognised authority on the traffic control. In 1933, he was appointed to the London and Home Counties Traffic Advisory Board. In 1938 he published Road Traffic and Its Control, which remained the only full-length study of the subject until after his death.

The outbreak of the Second World War brought its own problems for traffic, such as road safety during the blackout, the clearance of roads after bombing raids during the Blitz, and the necessity of giving priority to military and other essential traffic. In September 1942, Tripp published a second book, Town Planning and Road Traffic, which looked ahead to postwar reconstruction. In this book he pioneered the idea of motorways in Britain. In 1942, the Royal Academy invited him to become a member of its Planning Committee established to set up a scheme for London's architectural reconstruction after the war. Tripp retired from the Metropolitan Police and the London and Home Counties Traffic Advisory Committee on 1 May 1947, but remained a member of the Royal Academy Planning Committee until 1949. He was also a member of the Ministry of Transport Committee on Road Safety from 1943 until 1947. He supported the registration of bicycles, a policy which was not eventually endorsed by the committee.

Tripp was appointed Commander of the Order of the British Empire (CBE) in the 1935 New Year Honours and was knighted in the 1945 New Year Honours for his services during the war.

Personal life
Tripp never lost his interest in art, and many of his paintings were shown in the Royal Academy. More than twenty of his works were turned into posters.

He was also an enthusiastic yachtsman, both cruising and racing. He had a large number of articles published in the yachting press in both Britain and the United States, and also wrote four books on the subject:
 1924:Shoalwater and Fairway
 1926:Suffolk Sea Borders
 1928:Solent and the Southern Waters
 1950: Under the Cabin Lamp.

In 1910 he married Abigail Powell, a Dubliner. She died on 26 February 1951. They had a son and a daughter.

Footnotes

References
Obituary, The Times, 13 December 1954

External links

Photographic portraits of Tripp in the National Portrait Gallery

1883 births
1954 deaths
Assistant Commissioners of Police of the Metropolis
Knights Bachelor
Commanders of the Order of the British Empire
Civil servants from London
English male sailors (sport)
20th-century English painters
English male painters
Road transport in England
British urban planners
Civil servants in the Home Office
20th-century English male artists